This is a list of 111 species in the genus Prosimulium.

Prosimulium species

References